Euphysa is a genus of hydrozoans belonging to the family Corymorphidae.

The genus has cosmopolitan distribution.

Species:

Euphysa aurata 
Euphysa australis 
Euphysa brevia

References

Corymorphidae
Hydrozoan genera